Cora Skinner (born June 18, 1985) is an American glamour model and actress.

Early life and beginnings
Cora Skinner was born in Alexandria, Virginia and grew up in Creston, California. She was a tomboy while growing up at a 70-acre ranch. As a child, she was involved in dance, track and field, gymnastics, diving and cheerleading. She became interested with modelling when her sister was studying to be a fashion designer. While attending California State University, Long Beach, she began pursuing modelling. She competed in an international swimsuit competition and won Top Ten title. Afterwards, she signed with an agency and began pursuing modeling full-time.

Career

Print
Skinner has appeared in pictorials and features in Maxim USA, Maxim in Spain, FHM (USA), Maxim Belgium, Muscle & Fitness, and Playboy's lingerie catalog.  Skinner has been featured on her own set of Bench Warmer model trading cards. "These cards, which have also featured Pamela Anderson, Traci Bingham and even actress Charisma Carpenter, are traded just like baseball cards."  Skinner debuted on the model trading cards in 2006. She was brought back in 2007 for the Gold Card series of the model trading cards.  Skinner has been featured on the magazine cover photo of Hot Bike and Import Tuner.

Television

References

External links
Cora Skinner Official Website

Female models from Virginia
American television actresses
Living people
1985 births
California State University, Long Beach alumni
Legends Football League players
Actresses from Alexandria, Virginia
People from San Luis Obispo County, California
Actresses from California
21st-century American actresses